Quality Europe FM was a UK radio station transmitted across Europe via the Astra 1A satellite in the early 1990s. QEFM was one of the first European radio stations to use Direct to Home reception as its primary method of delivery, despite the use of the acronym "FM" (a reference to FM broadcasting) in its name.

History 
The station first broadcast briefly from Cheltenham (1991–1993). "Quality Europe FM started when Roy Litchfield came to me (Ray Pearson) and suggested that we take up a short licence to cover the Cheltenham Festival of Music that year. We kitted out a Caravan and sold local advertising. The idea then formed to go Satellite and as I had space in the top floor of a large house I had built, we constructed our own studios. We had many local presenters join us and many celebrities climbed the stair to our 2 studios. We played a full programme of music and covered many topics. We had many on air competitions which gained us a terrific following all over Europe. But sadly finance from advertisers meant that the tight budget we maintained was not viable."
 
It then moved to studios located next to the offices of HiTech Xtravision (a satellite decoder manufacturer at the time) in Albany Park, Camberley, Surrey, UK In 1993 which it later shared with its sister station Quality Country Music Radio (QCMR), Now known as Country Music Radio (CMR). The first broadcast from the new studios in Camberley was by Terry James. QEFM closed down in 1994 after a series of financial and management related problems. At its peak, QEFM boasted 23.8 million listeners a week over 26 countries.
Despite that QEFM became the number 1 satellite station after the demise of Radio Luxembourg in 1992.

Presentation 
On air QEFM had a very polished style and the studios in Camberley became home to some famous (or later famous) names. One such name was Dave Lee Travis, who after leaving the BBC in a much publicised split, briefly presented his independent commercial show via the station. Todd Slaughter, President of the Official Elvis Presley Fan Club, also broadcast a very popular Elvis Show which he handed over to Mike Adams, ex-Radio One contributor and BBC Midlands presenter.

While QEFM was primarily a MOR and pop music station, one of the few programmes to survive the station's closure in 1994 was Eric Wiltsher's "Satellite Surgery" (later known as the "Media Zoo"), which having originally moved to QEFM from Euronet, transferred across to Country Music Radio.

Station personnel
In Cheltenham:

Ray Pearson - Managing Director
Roy Litchfield - Station Manager
Clive Pearson - Station Assistant

Former presenters 
 Mike Adams
 Karl Bennett
 Terry Boydell (as Terry James)
 Stuart Cameron
 Jonathan Cohen
 Edward Cole
 Nick David
 Neil Francis
 Nick Gurney
 Steve Grant 
 Nicky James
 Keith Lewis
 Roy Litchfield
 Christopher Musk
 Alan Roberts (as Paul Revere)
 Andy Roberts
 Dave Lee Travis
 Neil Vincent
 Gary Weston
 Emma Whittard
 Steve Wilkinson
 Chris Williams ( Now at Manx Radio )
 Lee Williams
 Eric Wiltsher
 Simon Winyard
 Chris Jones
 Todd Slaughter
 Phil Humphris
 Spencer Evans

External links 
Eric Wiltsher's Twitter
Station MD & PR Consult

Defunct radio stations in the United Kingdom